Yelverton is a large village on the south-western edge of Dartmoor, Devon, in England.

When Yelverton railway station (on the Great Western Railway (GWR) line from Plymouth to Tavistock) opened in the 19th century, the village became a popular residence for Plymouth commuters. The railway is now closed, but the Plym Valley Railway has reopened a section of it.

Yelverton is well known for Roborough Rock - a prominent mass of stone close to the Plymouth road on the fringe of nearby Roborough Down, near the southern end of the airfield.  It gave its name to the Rock Hotel, built as a farm during the Elizabethan period, but converted in the 1850s to cater for growing tourism in the area.  The area to the south and west of the roundabout at the centre of the village was settled in late Victorian and Edwardian times, with many grand and opulent villas.  An area developed at about the same time on an odd shaped piece of land to the south of the Tavistock road is known as Leg o' Mutton Corner.

At the beginning of the Second World War, an airfield (RAF Harrowbeer) was constructed at adjacent Harrowbeer as a fighter station for the air defence of Devonport Dockyard and the Western Approaches.  A 19th century terrace of houses, now mostly converted into shops, had to have its upper storey removed to provide an easier approach.  One tall building which was not altered was St. Paul's Church, but the tower was hit by a plane, resulting in a warning light being fitted.  The layout of the runways is still very clear and although they are substantially grassed over, the many earth and brick protective bunkers built to protect the fighters from attack on the ground are all still in place.  Some American airmen and anti-aircraft battery units were stationed here during the second half of the war. A plane carrying President Roosevelt landed here when its original destination was fogbound.

To the south of the village is Langton Park, home of Yelverton Bohemians Cricket Club and about 0.5 km south is the accurately named Moorland Garden Hotel serving the Yelverton Golf Club where most of the holes run well down the open moorland to the east. There are several bed and breakfasts in Yelverton, serving the many walkers and visitors to National Trust properties in the area.

Seth Lakeman, the Mercury Music Prize nominee, comes from Yelverton.

Former Sadlers Wells Ballet star Maureen Bruce lives in Yelverton.

The present Ravenscroft Care Home was built as a private house but in the 1930s became Ravenscroft School and during the Second World War was the officers' mess of RAF Harrowbeer.

External links 
 Yelverton Community Page
 RAF Harrowbeer Site

Dartmoor